Vesilahti (also ) is a municipality of Finland.

It is part of the Pirkanmaa region.
is water.

The municipality is unilingually Finnish. The name of municipality literally means "water bay".

The Vesilahti municipality headlined the case of "pink house", which is owned one of local inhabitants, Katri Hakola. The municipality didn't agree with her color choice and threatened the homeowner with a 5,000 € penalty if the color of the house didn't change. Later, the municipality tended to accept only a slight change in color and abolished the penalty payment. The incident sparked emotions on social media and the indignities accused the municipality of "bureaucratic teasing".

Born in Vesilahti
 Jonne Järvelä, musician, member of the band Korpiklaani

References

External links

Municipality of Vesilahti – Official website

Municipalities of Pirkanmaa
Populated places established in 1869
1869 establishments in the Russian Empire